JSC Izhevsk Electromechanical Plant or  IEMZ Kupol for short is a Russian military R&D enterprise founded in 1957. It is located in Izhevsk (3 Pesochnaya str).

It is part of the Almaz-Antey holding.

Military products

Osa-AKM SAM
 Saman-M1 target-launching complex
Tor-M1 on tracked vehicle (older version of the system Tor)
Tor-M2E, on tracked vehicle
Tor-M2K on 6x6 wheeled vehicle
Tor M2 km air defense system that can be transported on trucks and stationed on buildings and ships.
99F678M simulator of Tor-M2E (K) on all-terrain trucks with the operation team can be trained realistically.
Modernizing 9K33M3 Osa-AKM (NATO code: SA-8 Gecko) to OSA-AKKM1.
Equipm 9K33M3 Osa-AKM to firing of rockets target.
carbon nanocomposite
metal alloys

Civilian products 
Mobile and fixed heaters which are powered by gas and / or liquid fuel.
IR heaters
Mobile heater fan
Operated heating "Screens" / air showers electrically or via heat exchange fluid
Gas-fired radiator heating
heat exchangers
Carbon nano-composite
Wastewater treatment plants, sewage treatment plants
Metal alloys
Oil production technology (electric pump)
Air conditioning systems for electric and diesel-powered locomotives
Medical technology (infusion bags and infusion tubing)
Ventilation valves for nuclear power plants
Plastic packaging for cosmetics and foods
Air traffic control systems like the Sintez ATC system

External links 
 Official website of IEMZ Kupol 
 IEMZ Kupol at Globalsecurity.org

References

1957 establishments in the Soviet Union
Defence companies of the Soviet Union
Science and technology in the Soviet Union
Almaz-Antey
Companies based in Udmurtia